Saint-Jérôme (also designated exo2, formerly known as Blainville–Saint-Jérôme) is a commuter railway line in Greater Montreal, Quebec, Canada. It is operated by Exo, the organization that operates public transport services across this region.

The Saint-Jérôme line was operated by the Canadian Pacific Railway (CPR) between 1882 and 1981. The line was not active until Exo's predecessor agency, the Agence Métropolitaine de transport (AMT), resumed passenger service in 1997.

There are 14 inbound and 14 outbound departures each weekday. There are six departures on Saturday and Sunday, although these trains terminate at De La Concorde station with connection to De La Concorde Metro station, instead of continuing to Parc or Lucien-L'Allier Station.

Overview
This line links the Lucien-L'Allier station in Downtown Montreal with Saint-Jérôme, on Montreal's North Shore.  More than 2000 Park and Ride spaces are available for commuters.

The line offers 14 inbound and outbound trains per day on weekdays and 6 inbound and outbound trains per day on weekends and civic holidays. The frequency of service is 25–45 minutes during rush hour and every one to two hours outside of rush hour. , all weekday trains terminate at or originate from Lucien-L'Allier station, except for three inbound and three outbound trains daily which terminate or originate at Parc station. On weekends, all trains terminate and originate at De La Concorde station.

Today, more than 14,000 people ride the line daily.

History

CP Service
The line between Montreal and Saint-Jérôme was built in 1876 by the Quebec, Montreal, Ottawa and Occidental Railway (QMOO), which was owned by the Government of Quebec. In 1881, it was sold to Canadian Pacific along with the line on the north shore of the St. Lawrence and Ottawa rivers, between Quebec City and Ottawa. CP operated Le petit train du nord, the Ottawa train via Lachute, the Quebec train via Trois-Rivières as well as the Sainte-Thérèse RDC train along this route between 1882 and 1979. P'tit Train du Nord formerly extended northwards beyond Saint-Jerome, into the ski hills of the Laurentians, once extending to Mont-Laurier

AMT Service
The Montreal–Blainville line was originally opened in July 1997 and was supposed to serve commuters during the construction on the Marius Dufresne Bridge. In its early stages of life, the AMT Blainville train was composed of a GP9 locomotive and four Canadian Vickers Gallery Coaches. Although it offered only three departures per day (two peak, one reverse peak), it instantly became very successful.  In 1997, there were only four stations: Blainville, Sainte-Thérèse, Saint-Martin, and Jean-Talon (now Parc).  The stations were merely wooden platforms with gravel parking lots; not too much money was spent because the line was not supposed to become permanent.  Service increased in September 1997 to six departures per day (four peak, two reverse peak) and stations were added at Sainte-Rose and Henri-Bourassa (now Bois-de-Boulogne), the line had become permanent.  The Rosemère station at Rosemère was built in 1998.

To make the operation successful, buses were used to carry passengers from areas around the stations in Blainville and Sainte-Thérèse.  These buses came from the CIT des Basses-Laurentides (now CIT Laurentides).  In Montreal, STCUM (now STM) buses were used from the Jean-Talon Station to downtown Montreal (Guy-Concordia) metro station (The 935 Trainbus Blainville / Centreville).

In 1999, the STCUM had problems with a number of buses in their Nova LFS fleet, pulling them off the roads completely.  To cope with the situation the AMT decided to extend the service from Parc metro directly downtown to Gare Windsor (now Lucien-L'Allier Terminus).

A little later, a stop was added at the currently-existing Vendôme station.

In late 2003, a stop was added at Montréal-Ouest. Trains previously passed through the station without stopping.

Following the collapse of the De la Concorde overpass in Laval in October 2006, the AMT opened the temporary station Vimont on Bellerose Boulevard in anticipation of increased ridership. The AMT also leased eight bilevel coaches and one F59PH locomotive from GO Transit to allow for additional trains in the short term. In November the highway was re-opened, and the leased train set was returned to GO Transit, but the Vimont station became a permanent stop on the line.

On January 8, 2007, the line was extended from Blainville to Saint-Jérôme, the new Chabanel station was also opened, and a new schedule was released. As a result, only 10 round trips are made per day, instead of 11.

On April 28, 2007, along with the opening of the metro to Laval, the De La Concorde station was opened. The Saint-Martin station was closed because of its proximity to De La Concorde.

In 2013, work was completed to double the track between Sainte-Rose station and Saint-Martin Junction and install Automatic Train Control (ATC) between Parc station and the end of the line in Saint-Jérôme. Various upgrading at different stations is ongoing and will be complete by November 2013. The $50-million project allowed for the addition of six weekday departures on August 5, 2013.

RTM service

On June 1, 2017, the AMT was dissolved and replaced by two new governing bodies, the Autorité régionale de transport métropolitain (ARTM) and the Réseau de transport métropolitain (RTM). The RTM took over all former AMT services, including this line, and changed its name to Exo in May 2018.

Construction on a new station, Mirabel, began in 2019. Initially scheduled for completion in 2020, it was opened on January 4, 2021. This station is lodged between Blainville and Saint-Jérôme, and was built in order to better serve residents of the area.

Future projects
The ARTM is currently considering the following future projects:
 The ARTM is planning a station in Outremont at the current site of the Outremont Yards. The Université de Montréal purchased the land and plans to convert the rail yards into a new campus in Montréal. The project is currently under study by the City of Montréal and the ARTM. No timeline has been given.
 The ARTM is studying improving access to its Blainville and Sainte-Thérèse train stations as well as doubling the railway between Sainte-Rose and Sainte-Thérèse, which includes work to double the track over a bridge.

Stations 
There are 14 stations on the Saint-Jérôme Line:

Notes
The Saint-Jérôme Line operates over the following Canadian Pacific Railway subdivisions:

* Saint-Luc Jct and Outremont are not passenger stops.

Exo owns the track from Sainte-Thérèse to Saint-Jérôme.

References

External links
 RTM - Saint-Jérôme line (official website)

Exo commuter rail lines
Railway lines opened in 1997
Transport in Laval, Quebec
Transport in Laurentides
Transport in Montreal
1997 establishments in Quebec